The Shenandoah Valley region of Virginia and parts of West Virginia is home to a long-established German-American community dating back to the 17th century. The earliest German settlers to Shenandoah, sometimes known as the Shenandoah Deitsch or the Valley Dutch, were Pennsylvania Dutch migrants who arrived from southeastern Pennsylvania. These German settlers travelled southward along the Great Wagon Road. The Pennsylvania Dutch are the descendants of German, Swiss, and Alsatian Protestants who began settling in Pennsylvania during the 1600s. These German refugees had fled the Rhineland-Palatinate region of southwestern Germany due to religious and political persecution during repeated invasions by French troops. From the colonial period to the early 1900s, people of Germanic heritage formed the social and economic backbone of the Shenandoah Valley. The majority of German settlers in the valley belonged to Anabaptist denominations such as the Mennonites, the Dunkers (now known as the Brethren), and others. Smaller numbers were German Catholics or German Jews. The earliest European settlers of the Shenandoah Valley were the Germans, who mostly settled in the northern portions of the valley, and the Scotch-Irish who mostly settled in the southern portions of the valley. The German language was commonly spoken in Shenandoah until World War I when anti-German sentiment resulted in many German-Americans abandoning their language and customs in order to assimilate into the cultural mainstream. 

The German contribution to the culture of the Shenandoah Valley has been substantial, with Germans popularizing Pennsylvania Dutch cuisine and shape note singing. Because white Southerners are often of English and Scotch-Irish ancestry, German-Americans have given the area some ethnic diversity, "a characteristic more Pennsylvanian then Virginian". While the valley is geographically Southern, the German contribution from the Mid-Atlantic has "made it appear Northern." In the 21st century, the Shenandoah Valley and Harrisonburg in particular have become known as a haven for refugees, with Mennonites and the Church of the Brethren playing a prominent role in helping resettle migrants from Latin America and elsewhere. The Mennonites and the Brethren have played an active role due to their denominational emphasis on pacifism and social justice, along with the Mennonite and Brethren history of being refugees from religious persecution in Europe. Current immigration of Latinos from the Caribbean, Central and South America is further diversifying the valley's culture.

History
In 1727, Adam Miller became the first white settler in the Shenandoah Valley. Miller was a Mennonite born in Schriesheim, Germany, who immigrated to Lancaster County, Pennsylvania in 1724 and on to the Shenandoah Valley three years later.

Mass German migration to the Shenandoah Valley and Northern Virginia began soon after 1725. While most Germans came from Pennsylvania (as well as New Jersey and New York), some migrated directly from the Old Country. This was the case with the colonies of Germanna and Germantown, as well as  several Swiss groups.

Slavery
Due to both economic reasons and Anabaptist objections to slavery, the German settlers in the Central Shenandoah Valley owned fewer slaves than average for white Virginians and white Southerners, and consequently the area has historically had a smaller African-American population than many other regions of the South. During the 1840s, 11% of Rockingham County's population were enslaved people; by comparison, 57% of the four adjacent counties to the east of the Blue Ridge Mountains were enslaved people. However, all white residents of the Shenandoah Valley were economically connected to slavery. White-owned farms in the Shenandoah Valley typically owned none, one, or several enslaved people. Large plantations employing many enslaved people also existed in the Shenandoah Valley. According to the National Park Service, the culture of the Shenandoah Valley was "part of a system of race-based slavery" and white residents of the Valley "used racism, violence, and fear to maintain it." Major Isaac Hite Jr., the grandson of the early German pioneer Jost Hite, became the owner of 15 enslaved people when he married Nelly Madison in 1783. Nelly's father James Madison Sr. gifted the couple the slaves as a wedding present. Isaac and Nelly lived together on the Belle Grove Plantation, owning 103 slaves by the 1810 census. Enslaved labor at Belle Grove Plantation was used for farming, as well as for a blacksmith shop, gristmill, sawmill, distillery, lime kiln, and quarry.

According to the historian Nancy Sorrells, the "lower number of slaves in the Shenandoah Valley before the Civil War has fostered the idea that slavery there was different or more benevolent", a claim she regards as false. According to Sorrells, 1 in 5 residents of Augusta County was a slave in 1861. Sorrells presented a program called "Slavery and its Aftermath in the Upper Valley" at the Augusta County Historical Society in 2015 explaining that "while there were some differences, slavery in the Valley was no less horrific or entwined in the culture than in any other slave society."

Demographics
By 1790, 28% of white residents living between Strasburg and Harrisonburg were German-Americans. A leader of these Germans, Jost Hite, had been granted 100,000 acres and he resold smaller family plots of between 100-500 acres to local German settlers.

In 1912, local historians estimated that approximately 70% of Rockingham County was of German extraction.

In 2008, the Valley Brethren-Mennonite Heritage Center estimated that the Central Shenandoah Valley was home to 16,000 Mennonites and Brethren, approximately 10% of the population. Around 800 were Old Order Mennonites, a group that is similar to Old Order Amish and who are distinguished by their highly distinctive traditional lifestyle and forms of dress.

Culture

Cuisine
The Pennsylvania German settlers of Shenandoah brought with them many staples of Pennsylvania Dutch cuisine, such as sauerkraut, apple butter, cabbage served with hot sauce, souse, ponhoss (scrapple), buckwheat pancakes, knödel, rivvels and ham bone pot pie. The staple grains were wheat, spelt, and barley. In lieu of bear garlic used in Germany, ramps were substituted.

Music
In 1809, Joseph Funk (a Mennonite of Bernese Swiss descent) and other descendants of the German Anabaptists who had been persecuted during the European wars of religion settled in what is now known as Singers Glen. Funk was a well known music teacher and composer, and thanks largely to him, Singers Glen is sometimes considered the birthplace of gospel music in the American South.

The Joseph Funk House and Singers Glen Historic District are listed on the National Register of Historic Places.

Religion

Christianity
The German-American population of the Shenandoah Valley is overwhelmingly Christian and predominantly Protestant in particular, mostly the Anabaptists. While the Mennonites and the Brethren have been the most prominent German Protestant denominations, smaller German denominations have existed such as the Lutherans and the Reformed. A minority of German Christians in Shenandoah have been non-Protestant, most notably the German Catholics.

Amish
There has never been a very large Amish population in the Shenandoah Valley, however a small community exists in Stuarts Draft. The Beachy Amish Mennonite community in Stuarts Draft has attracted press attention due to a high-profile 2012 kidnapping case involving a Beachy Amish-Mennonite minister from the community. Kenneth L. Miller, a Beachy Amish minister, was accused of aiding a woman to violate custody orders by fleeing to Nicaragua, where the woman and her daughter were hosted by missionaries of the sect. The woman, Lisa A. Miller (no relation to Kenneth Miller), renounced her lesbianism and had been blocking her ex-partner of many years from any contact with their daughter. Kenneth Miller was found guilty and sentenced to 27 months in prison for abetting an international parental kidnapping.

Mennonite
The first Mennonite settlers arrived in the Shenandoah Valley in 1728. These settlers established three main areas of early inhabitation. The first settlement was Massanutten, a Mennonite colony near Luray in what is today Page County. During the Seven Years' War, these settlements were nearly destroyed by Native Americans. Many of the Mennonites returned to Pennsylvania. However, after the danger subsided, Mennonites began to resettle in Shenandoah in Augusta and Rockingham counties. The second area of settlement was the Opequon colony in Frederick County. The third area of settlement, known as the Shenandoah colony, extended south from Strasburg along the western slope of the Massanutten Mountain. Over time, these three colonies expanded in size and number until they grew together to become one large German tract. By the time of the American Revolution, the Mennonite community had become firmly planted in the Shenandoah Valley.

The Mennonite, sharing common religious beliefs and common German and Swiss ethnic origins, were bonded together by both religion and ethnicity. For many years, the German language was an important cultural bond among the Mennonites. During the 18th century and much of the 19th century, German was commonly spoken in the Mennonite community and often used for the liturgies of Mennonite church services. John Weaver (1818-1877), John Geil (1799-1890), any many other Mennonite ministers exclusively used German during services. The last Mennonite minister to preach in German was Daniel Showalter (1802-1889) of Rockingham County. However, visiting Pennsylvania Dutch ministers would occasionally give German language sermons to older Mennonite congregation members. The last people to retain the Pennsylvania Dutch dialect were the Old Order Mennonite community in Rockingham County. While Old Order Mennonites exclusively use the English language today, some older Mennonites still spoke German at home until the 1940s and 1950s.

While historically almost all Mennonites were white people of Germanic ancestry, the Mennonite community has become more diverse in recent years. Due to Mennonite activities to resettle refugees, the Shenandoah Valley has become home to a large community of Hispanic and Latino Mennonites many of whom hail from Central America, Mexico, and elsewhere.

Brethren
The Dunker movement originated in Germany in the early 1700s. They were commonly known as the German Baptist Brethren. By 1908, they had officially changed their name to the Church of the Brethren. The Brethren first settled in southeastern Pennsylvania in the early 1700s, before moving to both Western Maryland and the Shenandoah Valley. Pacifists, the Brethren refused to serve for either the north or the south during the Civil War. They supported abolitionism, temperance, and teetotalism. In accordance with their belief in simplicity, a cappella hymns were sung with no musical accompaniment and churches were built without stained glass windows, crosses, or steeples. In Brethren congregations, men and women were segregated to separate sections of the church.

Beginning in the 1950s, the Bridgewater Church of the Brethren took a leading role in the modern settlement of refugees in the Shenandoah Valley. The first modern refugees were a Dutch Indonesian family the Brethren helped resettle in 1957.

Judaism
The small number of German Jews who have settled in the Shenandoah Valley have constructed two houses of worship: the Temple House of Israel, a Reform synagogue in Staunton; and the Beth El Congregation, a Reform synagogue in Harrisonburg. Many were German-speaking Jews from Bohemia. These Jews from Germany and Bohemia maintained a strong German identity and were highly active in German-American fraternal organizations, particularly in Harrisonburg. A number of Pennsylvanian German Jews migrated to the Shenandoah Valley, travelling along the same route of migration as other Pennsylvania Dutch people.

Integration
Throughout the history of German-American community life in the Shenandoah Valley, the Germans experienced some incidents of discrimination, but the community remained without serious persecution for most of its history. During the 18th century and the early 19th century, the Germans were largely accepted by the English and the Scotch-Irish who lived in the valley, and were considered to be merely a different shade of the native-born white American population of the area. The Germans settled the land at the same time as the English and the Scotch-Irish, so there were no competing claims for land ownership. The main area of ethnic conflict was in Winchester, where there was a mixed population of Germans, English, Irish, and Scotch-Irish. Riots broke out between the Germans and the Scotch-Irish in 1759 wherein the Germans were "much beaten and hurt." Anti-Irish sentiment existed amongst the Germans and it was once customary for Germans to exhibit an effigy of Saint Patrick on Saint Patrick's Day with a string of potatoes around his neck and an effigy of his wife Sheeley with her apron loaded with potatoes. Enraged Irish Catholics would retaliate against this indignity by displaying an effigy of Saint Michael on Saint Michael's Day with a rope of sauerkraut around his neck. During these spats between the Germans and the Irish, "many a black eye, bloody nose, and broken head was a result."

Historic places

Abraham Beydler House
Fort Bowman
Frontier Culture Museum of Virginia
Glebe Burying Ground
Heiston–Strickler House
Hupp House
John K. Beery Farm
Joseph Funk House
Mannheim (Linville, Virginia)
Peter Paul House
Singers Glen Historic District
Tunker House
Zirkle Mill

See also

German Americans
German Palatines
Germany Valley
Great Wagon Road
Palatinate (region)
Pennsylvania Dutch language
Pennsylvania Germans
Protestantism in Germany
Protestantism in Switzerland
Valley Pike

References

Further reading
Bly, Daniel W. Here to Stay: The Founding of a Jewish Community in the Shenandoah Valley of Virginia, 1840-1900, Otter Bay Books, 2016.
Good, Phyllis. Mennonite Recipes from the Shenandoah Valley, Good Books, 1999.
Longenecker, Stephen L. Shenandoah Religion: Outsiders and the Mainstream, 1716-1865, Baylor University Press, 2002.
Sappington, Roger E. The Brethren in Virginia: The History of the Church of the Brethren in Virginia'', The Committee for Brethren History in Virginia, 1973.

External links

Miller's Bake Shoppe - Amish-Mennonite Bakery in Virginia
Showalter History
Virginia Amish, Amish America

Amish in the United States
Church of the Brethren
German-American culture in Virginia
German-American culture in West Virginia
German-American history
German-Jewish culture in the United States
Mennonitism in Virginia
Palatine German settlement in Virginia
Pennsylvania Dutch culture in Virginia
Shenandoah Valley
Swiss-American culture in Virginia
Swiss-American culture in West Virginia
Swiss-American history